Free I.H: This Is Not the One You've Been Waiting For is a mixtape by American indie rock band Illuminati Hotties. It was self released on July 17, 2020. The mixtape comes after accusations to the band's former label, Tiny Engines, of violations of contractual agreements by their artists. The band bought out its contract with Tiny Engines with a cash settlement and royalties to the label on a future project. This situation inspired the creation of the mixtape, which was released to fulfill a contractual agreement with Tiny Engines.

Background 
The mixtape comes after the band's debut album, Kiss Yr Frenemies, which was released in 2018. Stevie Knipe of Adult Mom accused Tiny Engines, the band's former label, of a breach of contract due to the delayed payment of $8,000 in royalties. Other artists signed to the label also alleged that similar situations occurred. The co-founder of the record label, Chuck Daley, admitted to the delay of payments in an interview with Billboard. Following the controversy, Illuminati hotties decided to settle its contract in cash and royalties in a future project, inspiring the content and creation of this mixtape, which also fulfilled a contractual agreement with Tiny Engines. The album was largely written after the start of Let Me Do One More'''s production, which is an album released in 2021 by Illuminati Hotties. After the exit agreement with the band's former record label was secured, the production of Let Me Do One More was paused in order for the band leader of Illuminati Hotties, Sarah Tudzin to work on this mixtape, who also served as its producer. The title of the lead single of this album, "Will I Get Cancelled If I Write a Song Called, 'If You Were a Man, You’d Probably Be Cancelled'", was taken from text messages from Sadie Dupuis, who suggested its use, with Sarah Tudzin.

 Reception 

On the review aggregator website Metacritic, Free I.H: This Is Not the One You've Been Waiting For has a score of 82 out of 100 based on 7 reviews, indicating "universal acclaim". With Ian Cohen of Stereogum calling it "one of 2020’s most brash, defiant, and flat-out righteous projects", and Francesca Rose of Exclaim! claiming "Free I.H: This Is Not the One You've Been Waiting For shows how making music can be cathartic for an artist" while giving the album an 8/10. Juan Edgardo Rodriguez of No Ripcord also gave the album an 8/10, calling the mood of the album "rowdy and playful". Arielle Gordon of Pitchfork gave the album a 7.6/10, claiming that while the album is shorter than the band's previous release, Kiss Yr Frenemies'', it "packs in more stylistic variation and studio maneuvers".

Track listing

References

2020 mixtape albums
Rock albums by American artists
Self-released albums